Events from the year 1809 in Scotland.

Incumbents

Law officers 
 Lord Advocate – Archibald Colquhoun
 Solicitor General for Scotland – David Boyle

Judiciary 
 Lord President of the Court of Session – Lord Avontoun
 Lord Justice General – The Duke of Montrose
 Lord Justice Clerk – Lord Granton

Events 
  – the General Association of Operative Weavers is formed.
 May – a construction railway at the site of Bell Rock Lighthouse is completed.
 August – Crinan Canal declared "finally complete".
 16 August – Meikle Ferry disaster: An overloaded ferry crossing the Dornoch Firth to Tain market sinks, drowning 99.
 November – Thomas Telford certifies completion of his Dunkeld-Birnam bridge. His bridges at Ballater and Conon Bridge are also completed this year.
 11 November – the North British and Mercantile Insurance company commences business as a fire insurance office in Edinburgh.
 9 December – the Dumfries Courier is established as a weekly newspaper in Annan by Rev. Dr. Henry Duncan as The Dumfries and Galloway Courier.
 Highland Clearances – first commissioner for clearance of the Leveson-Gower family estates in Scotland for sheep farming, William Young, is appointed.
 The Tally Toor, a Martello tower, is erected off Leith.
 A bridge over the River Cart is washed away in a flood.
 Blackie and Son, publishers, are established in Glasgow by John Blackie as Blackie, Fullarton and Company.
 The Scottish Bible Society is established as the Edinburgh Bible Society, a missionary organization, by Christopher Anderson.
 The Caledonian Horticultural Society is established in Edinburgh.
 Arthur Edmondston's A View of the Ancient and Present State of the Zetland Islands is published.

Births 
 16 February – John Laing, bibliographer and Free Church minister (died 1880)
 20 April – James David Forbes, physicist, glaciologist and seismologist (died 1868 in Bristol)
 7 June – William Forbes Skene, historian (died 1892)
 22 August – John Hill Burton, historian (died 1881)
 27 August – John West, pioneer of food canning (died 1888 in the United States)
 8 September – Robert Reid Kalley, physician and Presbyterian missionary to the lusophone countries (died 1888)
 21 October – John Stenhouse, chemist (died 1880 in London)
 24 October – John Barr, poet (died 1889 in New Zealand)
 29 December – William Ewart Gladstone, Prime Minister of the United Kingdom (born in Liverpool; died 1898 in Wales)
 Alexander Allan, locomotive engineer (died 1891 in England)
 Archibald Campbell, born Douglas, laird (died 1868)

Deaths 
 14 January – Robert Anstruther, British Army general (born 1768; died on active service at Corunna)
 16 January – John Moore, British Army general (born 1761; killed in Battle of Corunna)
 24 January – James Duff, 2nd Earl Fife (born 1729; died in London)
 25 February – John Murray, 4th Earl of Dunmore, colonial governor (born 1730; died in Ramsgate)
 10 May – Andrew Bell, engraver, co-founder of the Encyclopædia Britannica (born 1726)
 3 August – Andrew Mackay, mathematician (born 1760; died in London)
 29 August – Robert Melvill, British Army general and antiquary (born 1723)
 8 October – James Elphinston, philologist (born 1721; died in London)
 18 December – Alexander Adam, classical scholar (born 1741)
 Sir William Douglas, 1st Baronet, landowner and industrialist

See also 
 1809 in the United Kingdom

References 

 
Years of the 19th century in Scotland
1800s in Scotland